Mohamed Nassim Yattou (born 27 March 1992) is an Algerian footballer who plays as a midfielder.

References

External links

 

1992 births
Living people
Association football midfielders
Algerian footballers
JS Kabylie players
People from El Biar
MO Béjaïa players
USM Alger players
RC Arbaâ players
MC Oran players
21st-century Algerian people